Vileyka (officially transliterated as Viliejka, also Вялейка; ;) is a city in Belarus and the administrative center of Vileyka District in Minsk Region. The first historical record dates from 16 November 1460.

The Vileyka VLF transmitter operated by the Russian Navy is located near Vileyka. It provides VLF communication between Russian Navy's headquarters and atomic submarines in the Atlantic, Indian and parts of the Pacific Ocean.

History
In the 10th–13th centuries, the territory was under the Principality of Polotsk, and in XIV–XVII under Grand Duchy of Lithuania as manor house Kurenets. The city was first mentioned in 1460 as a borough center of the Vileyka Starostwo of the Ashmyany county in Grand Duchy of Lithuania.
 1635 – Władysław IV Vasa bestowed Vileyka upon Aleksander Korwin Gosiewski "for exclusive service to the state".
 1765 – Vileyka has 30 houses, 165 inhabitants, and became a county center.
 1793 – during the Second Partition of Poland the town is ceded to the Russian Empire.
 1795 – under the decree of Catherine II of Russia the town receives the status of a city and becomes a center of Vileyka uyezd in Minsk Governorate, then Vilna Governorate (1842–1917).
 1810, May 24 – almost the entire city is destroyed by the fire.
 1861 – 2931 inhabitants, 1880 – 3450, by the end of 19th century – more than 3500 inhabitants.
 1906 – big sawmill started.
 1907 – the city acquires a branch of Warsaw – Saint Petersburg Railway and a city station.
 1915, September 14 – occupied by the German Army, but several days later recovered by the Russian Army during the Sventiany Offensive.
 1917, November 8 – Soviets come to power during the October Revolution
 1918, December – occupied by German Army
 1919 – ceded to Poland in the Peace of Riga following Polish–Soviet War, becoming the center of the Wilejka county in the Wilno Voivodeship (1923–1939)
 1939 – annexed back to Soviet Union during the Soviet invasion of Poland in accordance with the conditions of the Molotov–Ribbentrop Pact. Becomes center of the Vileyka Voblast of BSSR
 Several hundred people, mostly Polish political prisoners, sick and wounded, are executed prior to the departure of the occupying Soviet guards on June 24, 1941.
 1941, June 25 – occupied by troops of the German Army Group Centre during the first stage of Operation Barbarossa and placed under the administration of the Generalbezirk Weißruthenien of Reichskommissariat Ostland. Over 15,000 civilians massacred including 6,972 Polish Jews. See also: Belarusian Home Defence (BKA) pacification actions
 1941, July 12 and 30 – German SS forces murder the remaining Jewish citizens in Vileyka (over 500 people).
 1944, July 2 – Vileyka recaptured by troops of the 3rd Belorussian Front of the Red Army during the Minsk Offensive.
 1944 – the center of the Vileyka Raion formed
 1954 – furniture plant started
 1959 – repair plant opened
 1973 – "Zenit-BelOMO" optical plant started
 1973 – Vileyka reservoir started
 1998 – Vileyka hydropower station started

Geography
The modern city is located on the right bank of the river Viliya, in the northwest part of the Minsk region, 100 kilometers from Minsk. The town's population numbers 30,000 people. There is a railway station of the Molodechno-Polotsk line in the city. The roads to Maladzechna, Smarhoń, Myadzel, Dokshytsy, Pleshchanitsy run through the city. The town's industry is represented by the Zenit plant, wood processing enterprises (including a furniture factory), a motor repair plant, building materials plants, light and food enterprises. Vileyka also houses the Museum of Regional Studies.

Forests account for 41% of the territory. The main part of the district is situated within the borders of Narach-Vileyka lowland.

Demography

International relations

Twin towns — Sister cities
Vileyka is twinned with:
  Mozhaysk, Russia
  Pereiaslav, Ukraine
  Willmar, Minnesota, United States

References

External links

 Official site of Vileyka Regional Executive Committee
 Pictures of nearby Russian Navy long-haul communications center
 Photos of Vilejka at Radzima.org
 Foto,Forum,Articles – Vilejka.be.together! 
 Unofficial reference and information site of Vileyka 

Holocaust locations in Belarus
Mass murder in 1941
Massacres committed by the Soviet Union
Populated places in Minsk Region
Soviet World War II crimes
Towns in Belarus
Vileyka District
Vileysky Uyezd
Vilnius Voivodeship
Wilno Voivodeship (1926–1939)